George Farmer (1863 – 4 May 1905) was a Welsh footballer who played in the Football League for Everton. On signing from Oswestry Town he became Everton's first ever professional player, and was the first player to score in a recognised competitive match for the club - a 2–2 draw in an FA Cup first round replay against Bolton Wanderers.

Early career
Farmer was originally a skinner by trade. He signed for his local club, Oswestry Town, in 1881. In 1884 he helped Oswestry Town to win the Welsh Cup and, they reached the Final, as cup-holders the following year. He was awarded two caps by Wales in 1885 (against England and Scotland). He was signed by Everton in February 1885 and made his Everton debut in March 1885 against Crewe Alexandra. In the 1885–86 season he scored 34 goals from 41 games and played in six different positions. He scored 23 goals in the 1886–87 season and 15 goals in 1887–88. In the pre-Football League era he played 131 times for Everton scoring 80 goals. Farmer was 5'6" tall, he was a clever, constructive player, noted as a 'fine passer' who was capable of 'beautiful work'. He was also adept with in-swinging corner-kicks.

1888-1889 season
Farmer made his League debut on 8 September 1888, playing as a winger, at Anfield, the home of Everton. The home team defeated the visitors Accrington 2–1. Farmer scored his debut and only League goal on 6 October 1888, playing as a wing–half, at Anfield. Everton defeated the visitors Aston Villa 2–0 and Farmer scored the second of the two Everton goals. Farmer appeared in 21 of the 22 League matches played by Everton and scored one League goal.

End of career
Farmer played more as a reserve player in 1889–90 but he did make ten appearances. He left Everton in 1890 and played for a number of non-league Merseyside clubs before retiring as a player. His life after football is not in the records. He died in Liverpool on 4 May 1905 at the age of 42.

References

1863 births
1905 deaths
Sportspeople from Oswestry
Association football wing halves
English footballers
Welsh footballers
Wales international footballers
Oswestry Town F.C. players
Everton F.C. players
Liverpool South End F.C. players
Rock Ferry F.C. players
English Football League players